Nepotyagovo is a rural locality (a settlement) and the administrative center of Spasskoye Rural Settlement, Vologodsky District, Vologda Oblast, Russia. The population was 1,200 as of 2002. There are 31 streets.

Geography 
Nepotyagovo is located 11 km southwest of Vologda (the district's administrative centre) by road. Kudrino is the nearest rural locality.

References 

Rural localities in Vologodsky District